Felix Gottwald (born 13 January 1976 in Zell am See, Austria, now resides in Salzburg, Austria) is an Austrian Nordic combined athlete who competed from 1994 to 2007 and then returned to compete in 2009.

Gottwald made his Olympic debut as an 18-year-old in the 15 km individual event at the 1994 Winter Olympics, then competed in the 4 x 5 km team and 15 km individual events at the 1998 Winter Olympics. Gottwald won bronze medals in the 7.5 km sprint, 15 km individual and 4 x 5 km team Nordic combined events at the 2002 Winter Olympics. Coming into the 2006 Winter Olympics in Turin, he had regularly ranked among the top three in the world. He won golds in the 7.5 km sprint and 4 x 5 km team competitions, and took silver in the 15 km individual. At the 2010 Winter Olympics, Gottwald won gold in the 4 x 5 km team event. He is the most decorated Nordic combined skier at the Winter Olympics with seven medals.

Gottwald topped the World Cup standings in 2001, and was a member of the Austrian team that won gold at the 2003 FIS Nordic World Ski Championships. Eight years later, at the 2011 World Championships in Oslo, he was again part of the Austrian team that became team world champion both in the normal hill and in the large hill competition. He also has two silvers (4 x 5 km team: 2001, 15 km individual: 2003) and six bronzes (15 km individual: 2001, 2005, 7.5 km sprint: 2003, normal hill: 2011, 4 x 5 km team: 1997, 2005) from the World Championships. So he is also the most decorated Nordic combined skier at World Championships with eleven medals.

Gottwald also has won twice at the Holmenkollen ski festival in the Nordic combined (2001, 2003 individual). He also won the Holmenkollen medal in 2003 (shared with Ronny Ackermann).

Gottwald retired at the end of the 2006-07 World Cup.  He chose to return from retirement in May 2009, in order to compete in another season, including the Olympics. Prior to that he was working for an Austrian television network as a color commentator.

After the Olympic season he added another one, and with his victories in Kuusamo (27 November 2010) and Schonach (8 January 2011) he became the oldest winner of a nordic combined competition.

See also 
 Felix Gottwald Ski Jumping Stadium

Notes and references

 Fanlisting
 
  - click Holmenkollmedaljen for downloadable pdf file 
  - click Vinnere for downloadable pdf file 
  

1976 births
Austrian male Nordic combined skiers
Holmenkollen medalists
Holmenkollen Ski Festival winners
Living people
Nordic combined Grand Prix winners
Nordic combined skiers at the 1994 Winter Olympics
Nordic combined skiers at the 1998 Winter Olympics
Nordic combined skiers at the 2002 Winter Olympics
Nordic combined skiers at the 2006 Winter Olympics
Nordic combined skiers at the 2010 Winter Olympics
FIS Nordic Combined World Cup winners
Olympic Nordic combined skiers of Austria
Olympic gold medalists for Austria
Olympic silver medalists for Austria
Olympic bronze medalists for Austria
People from Zell am See
Olympic medalists in Nordic combined
FIS Nordic World Ski Championships medalists in Nordic combined
Medalists at the 2010 Winter Olympics
Medalists at the 2006 Winter Olympics
Medalists at the 2002 Winter Olympics
Sportspeople from Salzburg (state)